John Leslie Mitchinson (31 March 1932 – 17 December 2021) was an English operatic tenor.

Mitchinson was born in Blackrod, Lancashire. He made his début singing the role of Jupiter in Handel's Semele. From 1972 to 1978, he was associated with the Sadler's Wells opera company; during that time, he created the role of the Poet in Joseph Tal's opera Massada 967 which premiered in 1972. In 1978 he joined the Welsh National Opera, with whom he worked for four years. Able to sing a variety of roles, he portrayed Peter Grimes and Tristan during this period, among others.

He sang the title role of Wagner's Rienzi in a 1976 BBC broadcast of one of the rare performances in recent history of the complete opera; a recording of this broadcast survives and has circulated.

Mitchinson married the mezzo-soprano Maureen Guy in 1958. She died in 2015. He died on 17 December 2021, at the age of 89. He was survived by his two sons, David and Mark.

References

Sources
Grove Music Online biography

External links
"The First Digital Tristan – a talk with the Maestro, the Hero and the Boss" by Bruce Duffie.  Wagner News, February 1982.

1932 births
2021 deaths
English tenors
Musicians from Manchester
Musicians from the Metropolitan Borough of Bolton
People from Blackrod